Killi river, also called Killiyar, the main tributary of Karamana River, originates at Theerthankara close to Panavur  in Nedumangad taluk of Thiruvananthapuram district. The river enters Thiruvananthapuram city at Vazhayila and flows through Mannammoola, Maruthankuzhi, Edapazhinji, Jagathi, Killippalam, Attukal, Kalady South and merges with Karamana River at Pallathukadavu. Attukal Temple is situated on the banks of this river.

References 

 Trees Dumped in the Killiyar
 Killiyar Finally To Get Cleaned 

Rivers of Thiruvananthapuram district